NGC 4323 is a lenticular or dwarf elliptical galaxy located about 52.5 million light-years away in the constellation Coma Berenices. The galaxy was discovered in 1882 by astronomer Wilhelm Tempel and is a member of the Virgo Cluster.

NGC 4323 is commonly misidentified as NGC 4322, which is a 13th magnitude star.

Interaction with Messier 100
The two galaxies appear to be interacting, as evidenced by Messier 100's rotation curve, an asymmetry of its HI disk, and a faint, optical bridge that connects it to NGC 4323. However, Knapen et al. suggests that the two galaxies are not interacting as NGC 4323 is a small galaxy and has a large separation from Messier 100.

See also
 List of NGC objects (4001–5000)

References

External links

 NGC 4323

40171
Dwarf elliptical galaxies
Coma Berenices
Messier 100
4323
Virgo Cluster
Astronomical objects discovered in 1882
Lenticular galaxies
Interacting galaxies